Robert Scully may refer to:

 Robert Guy Scully (born 1950), Canadian broadcaster and producer
 Robert Walter Scully Jr., whose actions inspired the 2014 film Supremacy
 Robert Scully (footballer) (born 1960), Malaysian ex-soccer player and coach